Darkly Dreaming Dexter is a 2004 novel by Jeff Lindsay, the first in his crime horror series about American forensic analyst/serial killer Dexter Morgan. It formed the basis of the Showtime television series Dexter and won the 2005 Dilys Award and the 2007 Book to TV award.

Plot
Dexter Morgan works for the Miami-Dade Police Department as a forensic blood spatter analyst. In his spare time, he is a vigilante serial killer who targets murderers, rapists, child molesters and other undesirables he believes the legal system has failed to stop. Dexter's murders are directed by an inner voice he refers to as "The Dark Passenger", prodding Dexter to satisfy his homicidal urges on a regular basis. When accomplished, the voice is placated for a while, but always, eventually returns.

Flashbacks reveal that Dexter's foster father, an esteemed police detective named Harry Morgan, recognized early on that he was a violent psychopath with an innate need to kill, and taught him how to kill people who had gotten away with horrific crimes as a way to channel his homicidal urges in a "positive" direction. Harry also taught the boy to be a careful and meticulous killer, to leave no clues, and to be absolutely sure that his victims were guilty before killing them. Dexter calls these rules "The Code of Harry."

Dexter succeeds in managing his double life until he investigates the "Tamiami Slasher," who has murdered three prostitutes. His adoptive sister, Deborah, who is also on the force and wants to be promoted to Homicide—and knowing that her brother has eerie "hunches"—asks him for help in solving the case. Because of his moral code, Dexter helps Deborah. Yet, he feels a compelling pull to the killer, due to similar desires. After a lucid dream, Dexter drives around Miami and spots a refrigerated truck. When he follows the truck, the killer throws a severed head in his car.

The killer begins sending messages to Dexter, who finds the crimes fascinating. Dexter is torn between helping Deborah and allowing the killer to continue his spree. Meanwhile, due to his strange dreams, Dexter wants to kill somebody, so he follows a man whom he suspects of raping and killing five teenage girls and kills him after confirming his guilt. The Tamiami Slasher kidnaps Deborah and brings Dexter to the scene, revealing that his sister is being held in the same shipping container that Dexter's biological mother, Laura, was held in. The killer is Dexter's biological brother, Brian, who was separated from Dexter after their mother's murder at the hands of a drug dealer. As Deborah's spiteful colleague, Migdia LaGuerta, arrives on the scene, Brian is disappointed that Dexter refuses to kill Deborah. Dexter allows Brian to kill LaGuerta and helps him escape, out of a sense of familial loyalty. In the epilogue, Dexter stands at LaGuerta's funeral and feels sad, but cannot bring himself to cry.

Award
Darkly Dreaming Dexter won the 2005 Dilys Award presented by the Independent Mystery Booksellers Association.

Television series adaptation

The novel is the basis for a TV series on the cable network Showtime.  Whereas the first season largely followed the plot of the original book, subsequent seasons featured original storylines not directly based on subsequent "Dexter" novels.

Darkly Dreaming Dexter was also featured on an episode of Booked, a Canadian television series that investigates crime fiction novels through the eyes of real forensic science experts.

In popular culture
In "The Chris Rock Test", the second episode of the fifth season of the television series Billions, Charles “Chuck” Rhoades, is in a session with a therapist. When prompted by the therapist to choose a 'wise person', Rhoades, an avid reader of crime fiction, nominates Dexter's father, Harry Morgan, for guidance.

References

External links

2004 American novels
Dexter (series)
American crime novels
American thriller novels
Dilys Award-winning works